Trifid is Latin for "split into three parts" or "threefold" and may refer to:

Trifid (journal), a Czech-language periodical
Trifid Nebula in the constellation Sagittarius
Trifid cipher, a fractionated cipher
 Trifid (software), suite of manufacturing software by Plessey.

Distinguish from
Triffid, a fictional dangerous mobile plant in the 1951 novel The Day of the Triffids by John Wyndham
The Triffids, a popular Australian band named for the plant

See also
 The Day of the Triffids (disambiguation)